A whisk is a cooking utensil which can be used to blend ingredients smooth or to incorporate air into a mixture, in a process known as whisking or whipping. Most whisks consist of a long, narrow handle with a series of wire loops joined at the end. The loops can have different shapes depending on a whisk's intended functions. The wires are usually metal, but some are plastic for use with nonstick cookware. Whisks are also made from bamboo.

Whisks are commonly used to whip egg whites into a firm foam to make meringue, or to whip cream into whipped cream.

History

Bundles of twigs, typically apple, have long been used as whisks; often the wood used would lend a certain fragrance to the dish. An 18th-century Shaker recipe calls to "Cut a handful of peach twigs which are filled with sap at this season of the year. Clip the ends and bruise them and beat the cake batter with them. This will impart a delicate peach flavor to the cake."

The process of producing  was kept secret and passed on by patrilineally by family craftsmen for hundreds of years.

The wire whisk was invented sometime before 1841.

In the United States, cranked rotary egg beaters became more popular than whisks in the 20th century. Julia Child is credited with re-introducing the wire whisk in her first ever televised appearance, in 1963.

Types

Mechanisms

Since the 19th century, various mechanical devices have been designed to make whisking more efficient, under the names "egg beater", "rotary mixer", etc.

See also

Mixer (cooking)
Pastry blender
fly-whisk: for brushing away flies

References

Food preparation utensils
Bartending equipment